Alphabetical Country List – Parties in North America with representation in their domestic federal parliament.  Also noted are any affiliations with political internationals.

List of countries

See also
 List of political parties by United Nations geoscheme
 List of political parties in the Caribbean by country
 List of political parties in Central America by country
 List of political parties in South America by country

North America